Cicada is a 2020 American romantic drama film directed by Matthew Fifer and Kieran Mulcare. Fifer co-wrote the film with Sheldon D. Brown, both of whom starred in leading roles.

After its original premiere was canceled from Covid-19, the film played at Outfest Film Festival on August 22, 2020, with the European premiere at the 64th BFI London Film Festival. It received a limited theatrical from Strand Releasing in the United States October 29, 2021. It was subsequently nominated for an Independent Spirit Award for Best First Screenplay.

Synopsis 
Ben spends his days living in Brooklyn and taking on a series of odd jobs, while at night he has meaningless one-night stands that leave him feeling empty inside. He suffers from hypochondria and has a set routine that he frequently goes through with his physician, Dr. Dragone. Ben's life takes on new meaning when he meets Sam, a data analyst, while browsing for books. They quickly grow very close to each other, each admitting personal secrets that they had never really told to anyone else before. Ben comes forward about his childhood sexual abuse and while Sam admits that he has post traumatic stress disorder from being shot and also has not come out yet to his extremely religious father. As the two grow closer still, they soon realize that each must come to terms with their traumas if the relationship is to survive.

Cast  
 Matt Fifer as Ben 
 Sheldon D. Brown as Sam 
 Sandra Bauleo as Debbie
 Jazmin Grace Grimaldi as Amber 
 Cobie Smulders as Sophie 
 Scott Adsit as Dr. Dragone 
 Michael Potts as Francis
 David Burtka as Bo 
 Jo Firestone as Tracy 
 Jason Greene as Theresa

Production 
Fifer wrote the script based upon his own life experiences.  Cicada was developed with the support of Tribeca's TFI Network, and was produced by Ramfis Myrthil of Beast of the East Productions and Jeremey Truong of rubbertape.

Release 
The film was meant to premiere at the BFI Flare: London LGBTIQ+ Film Festival in March 2020, but the event was canceled due to the COVID-19 pandemic. It instead premiered at the Outfest Film Festival on August 20, 2020, being made available for streaming on Vimeo until August 23. It was also screened at the Outfest Drive-In at the Calamigos Ranch in Malibu on August 22.

The film was released in select theatres in the United States by Strand Releasing beginning October 29, 2021. It premiered at the Quad Cinema in New York City, before being released on PVOD services and in Los Angeles and Glendale on November 5. The film was later released at The Loft Cinema in Tucson on November 10 and the Syndicated Bar Theater in Brooklyn on November 19.

Reception 
The critical consensus on Rotten Tomatoes reads, "A feast for the eyes as well as the heart, Cicada takes a bittersweet -- and beautifully acted -- look at the bonds of love."

Variety's Guy Lodge reviewed Cicada, stating that it was an "untidy but beguiling study of two Brooklyn men negotiating romance and trauma". The Hollywood Reporter praised the film's characters, while also writing that the "stylistic leaps can also be overdone and vague". Albert Nowicki of Prime Movies labelled the film as "naturalistic", and praised the actors for their "raw", "understated" performances.

Awards 

 Audience Award at Image+Nation (2020, won)
 Jury Prize at LesGaiCineMad, Madrid International LGBT Film Festival
 Honorable Mention in Narrative Feature at NewFest: New York's LGBT Film Festival
 2nd Place for Jury Prize in Best Feature at OUTshine Film Festival
 Audience Award for Best Narrative Feature at Oslo/Fusion International Film Festival
 Jury Award for Best Feature Film at Out Film CT
 Jury Award (Best Feature)+ Audience Award (Best Male Feature) at Roze Filmdagen; Amsterdam LGBTQ Film Festival

References

External links
 

2020 drama films
2020 films
2020 LGBT-related films
American drama films
American LGBT-related films
Brooklyn in fiction
Films impacted by the COVID-19 pandemic
Films set in Brooklyn
Gay-related films
Bisexuality-related films
2020s English-language films
2020s American films
Male bisexuality in film